James Edward Hewson (March 15, 1918 – October 17, 1978) was an American racewalker and rower. He competed in the men's 20 kilometres walk at the 1956 Summer Olympics.

Hewson, a native of Buffalo, New York, was murdered during a robbery while he was working as a night bridge tender on the Black Rock Canal in Buffalo in 1978. He was inducted into the Greater Buffalo Sports Hall of Fame in 2018.

References

External links
 

1918 births
1978 deaths
Athletes (track and field) at the 1956 Summer Olympics
American male racewalkers
Olympic track and field athletes of the United States
Place of birth missing
Male murder victims
American male rowers
Pan American Games medalists in rowing
Pan American Games silver medalists for the United States
Rowers at the 1955 Pan American Games
Track and field athletes from Buffalo, New York
Rowers from Buffalo, New York